Tamás Gábor (24 April 1932 – 6 May 2007 in Budapest) was a Hungarian Olympic champion épée fencer.

Gábor was born in Budapest, Hungary, and was Jewish.

Fencing career

National championships

He was a five-time Hungarian champion.

World championships

In World Championships competition, Gábor's individual medals were a bronze medal in 1961 and a silver medal in 1962. In Team competitions he won three medals:  silver in 1957 and 1958, and gold in 1959.

Olympic career
In 1960 Gábor came in 17th in individual épée and 4th in Team épée at the Olympics in Rome. He won a gold medal in Team Epee with his Hungarian team at the 1964 Summer Olympics in Tokyo.

Hall of Fame
Gábor was inducted into the International Jewish Sports Hall of Fame in 1996.

Outside fencing

Outside fencing, Gábor worked in the hotel business.

See also
List of select Jewish fencers

References

External links
Jewish Sports bio
Jews in Sports bio
Jewish Sports Legends bio

1932 births
2007 deaths
Hungarian male épée fencers
Jewish Hungarian sportspeople
Jewish male épée fencers
Fencers at the 1960 Summer Olympics
Fencers at the 1964 Summer Olympics
Olympic fencers of Hungary
Olympic gold medalists for Hungary
Olympic medalists in fencing
International Jewish Sports Hall of Fame inductees
Medalists at the 1964 Summer Olympics
Fencers from Budapest